Cephalozia connivens is a species of liverwort belonging to the family Cephaloziaceae.

Synonym:
 Cephalozia connivens var. connivens
 Jungermannia connivens Dicks.

References

Cephaloziaceae
Taxa named by James Dickson (botanist)